Mäkinen is a surname originating in Finland (in Finnish, it means "hilly"), where it is the fourth most common surname. Notable people with the surname include:

Jarmo Mäkinen (born 1958), Finnish actor
John Makinen, 1900 founder of the town Makinen, Minnesota
Heikki Mäkinen (1888–1960), Finnish house painter and politician
Kaarlo Mäkinen (1892–1980), Finnish wrestler, silver medal winner at the 1924 Summer Olympics
Konsta Mäkinen (born 1992), Finnish ice hockey player
Kalle Mäkinen (born 1989), Finnish footballer
Marvin Makinen (born 1939), U.S. biochemist, Human Rights activist
Merja Makinen (born 1953), director of communication and culture at Middlesex University
Pertti Mäkinen (born 1952), Finnish sculptor, designed the Finnish 1 euro coin
Rauno Mäkinen (born 1931), Finnish wrestler, gold medal winner at the 1956 Summer Olympics
Riitta Mäkinen, Finnish politician
Santeri Mäkinen (born 1992), Finnish footballer
Seppo Mäkinen (born 1941), Finnish sports shooter
Timo Mäkinen (1938–2017), Finnish rally driver
Tommi Mäkinen (born 1964), Finnish rally driver
Visa Mäkinen (born 1945), Finnish film director and producer

References

Finnish-language surnames